Johan Georg Geitel (1683–1771), also Johann or Hans Jürgen Geitell, Geittel or Geittell, was a Finnish painter.

Geital was born in Braunschweig, Germany, and later moved to Stockholm and then Finland. He primarily painted religious-themed paintings and portraits. When Geital relocated to Turku, the painters Claes Lang and Jonas Bergman protested, claiming there was not enough work for all of them. The local registrar's office granted Geital permission for only church historical paintings.  He taught at the Royal Academy of Turku from 1758 to 1763.

In 1755 he painted the altarpiece for Paimio church. He produced paintings the Nousiainen church in 1756, the Lempäälä church in 1759, and the manor house for the Bishop of Turku in 1760. Geital died 1771 in Turku.

References

 Some content translated from the corresponding Finnish Wikipedia article

1683 births
1771 deaths
Artists from Braunschweig
People from Brunswick-Lüneburg
17th-century Finnish painters
18th-century Finnish painters
18th-century male artists
Finnish male painters
Finnish people of German descent
German emigrants to Finland